The Cuban Athletics Championships is an annual track and field competition which serves as the national championship for Cuba. It is organised by Cuban Athletics Federation, Cuba's national governing body for the sport of athletics.< The national championship has been contested within different meetings, principally either the Copa Cuba or the Barrientos Memorial. The competition has also been held in conjunction with the Olimpiada del Deporte Cubano when that competition is held.

Men

100 metres
1986: Osvaldo Lara
1987: Ricardo Chacón
1988: Andrés Simón
1989: Ricardo Chacón
1990: Andrés Simón
1991: Joel Isasi
1992: Andrés Simón
1993: Joel Isasi
1994: Leonardo Prevost
1995: Joel Isasi
1996: Luis Alberto Pérez-Rionda
1997: Luis Alberto Pérez-Rionda
1998: Freddy Mayola
1999: Luis Alberto Pérez-Rionda
2000: Freddy Mayola
2001: Freddy Mayola
2002: Juan Pita
2003: Luis Alexander Reyes
2004: Juan Pita
2005: Luis Alexander Reyes
2006: Henry Vizcaíno

200 metres
1986: Sergio Querol
1987: Leandro Peñalver
1988: Roberto Hernández
1989: Félix Stevens
1990: Leandro Peñalver
1991: Joel Lamela
1992: Iván García
1993: Iván García
1994: Jorge Aguilera
1995: Iván García
1996: Iván García
1997: Gabriel González
1998: Misael Ortiz
1999: Iván García
2000: Iván García
2001: Alianni Hechevarría
2002: Alianni Hechevarría
2003: Juan Pita
2004: Luis Alexander Reyes
2005: Luis Alexander Reyes
2006: Michel Herrera

400 metres
1986: Félix Stevens
1987: Roberto Hernández
1988: Roberto Hernández
1989: Jorge Valentín
1990: Roberto Hernández
1991: Roberto Hernández
1992: Roberto Hernández
1993: Robelis Darroman
1994: Norberto Téllez
1995: Norberto Téllez
1996: Norberto Téllez
1997: Norberto Téllez
1998: Georkis Vera
1999: Norberto Téllez
2000: Norberto Téllez
2001: Edel Evia
2002: Glauder Garzón
2003: Yeimer López
2004: Glauder Garzón
2005: William Collazo
2006: Yeimer López

800 metres
1986: Roberto Ramos
1987: Raúl Mesa
1988: Raúl Mesa
1989: Héctor Herrera
1990: Héctor Herrera
1991: Ángel Carnesolta
1992: Héctor Herrera
1993: Osiris Mora
1994: Alain Miranda
1995: Norberto Téllez
1996: Alain Miranda
1997: Norberto Téllez
1998: Norberto Téllez
1999: Omar Torres
2000: Omar Torres
2001: Norberto Téllez
2002: Yeimer López
2003: José Luis Ricol
2004: 
2005: Yeimer López
2006: Maury Surel Castillo

1500 metres
1986: Félix Mesa
1987: Omar Molina
1988: Amado Ramos
1989: Roilando Delís
1990: Raúl Mesa
1991: Amado Ramos
1992: Amado Ramos
1993: Silvio García
1994: Amado Ramos
1995: Amado Ramos
1996: Bismark Ramírez
1997: Ereisis Torres
1998: Ereisis Torres
1999: Ismael Iglesias
2000: Ereisis Torres
2001: Ereisis Torres
2002: Maury Surel Castillo
2003: Maury Surel Castillo
2004: 
2005: Maury Surel Castillo
2006: Maury Surel Castillo

5000 metres
1986: Juan Jesús Linares
1987: Juan Jesús Linares
1988: Juan Ramón Conde
1989: Juan Ramón Conde
1990: Juan Ramón Conde
1991: Juan Ramón Conde
1992: Juan Ramón Conde
1993: Juan Ramón Conde
1994: Luis Cadet
1995: Amado Ramos
1996: Ismael Iglesias
1997: Ismael Iglesias
1998: Ismael Iglesias
1999: Geovanny Santana
2000: Henry Jaén
2001: Aguelmis Rojas
2002: Henry Jaén
2003: Norbert Gutiérrez
2004: Maury SurelCastillo
2005: Liván Luque
2006: José Alberto Sánchez

10,000 metres
1986: Alberto Cuba
1987: Alberto Cuba
1988: Alberto Cuba
1989: Alberto Cuba
1990: Ángel Rodríguez
1991: Ángel Rodríguez
1992: Ángel Rodríguez
1993: Ángel Rodríguez
1994: Alberto Cuba
1995: Luis Cadet
1996: Ángel Ferreiro
1997: Luis Cadet
1998: ?
1999: Alberto Cuba
2000: Aguelmis Rojas
2001: Aguelmis Rojas
2002: Aguelmis Rojas
2003: Norbert Gutiérrez
2004: ?
2005: Aguelmis Rojas
2006: Norbert Gutiérrez

Marathon
1986: Andrés Chávez
1987: Dimas Álvarez
1988: Dimas Álvarez
1989: José Rodríguez
1990: Dimas Álvarez
1991: Alberto Cuba
1992: ?
1993: ?
1994: ?
1995: José Rodríguez
1996: ?
1997: Alexis Cuba
1998: Irán Trutié
1999: Alberto Cuba
2000: ?
2001: ?
2002: ?
2003: Yosbel Arboláez
2004: Aguelmis Rojas
2005: ?
2006: ?

3000 metres steeplechase
1986: Juan Ramón Conde
1987: Ángel Rodríguez
1988: Juan Ramón Conde
1989: Juan Ramón Conde
1990: Juan Ramón Conde
1991: Juan Ramón Conde
1992: Juan Ramón Conde
1993: Juan Ramón Conde
1994: Juan Ramón Conde
1995: Romelio Vergolla
1996: Ismael Iglesias
1997: Romelio Vergolla
1998: Ismael Iglesias
1999: Ismael Iglesias
2000: Yunier González
2001: Bismark Ramírez
2002: Bismark Ramírez
2003: Yoandri Caraballo
2004: Yandri Chivás
2005: Osmani Calzado
2006: José Alberto Sánchez

110 metres hurdles
1986: Juan Saborit
1987: Jacinto Álvarez
1988: Emilio Valle
1989: Emilio Valle
1990: Manuel Mayor
1991: Omar Portuondo
1992: Emilio Valle
1993: Emilio Valle
1994: Emilio Valle
1995: Emilio Valle
1996: Erik Batte
1997: Anier García
1998: Anier García
1999: Anier García
2000: Anier García
2001: Emilio Valle
2002: Yoel Hernández
2003: Yuniel Hernández
2004: Yuniel Hernández
2005: Anier García
2006: Dayron Robles

400 metres hurdles
1986: Francisco Velazco
1987: Emilio Valle
1988: Francisco Velazco
1989: Francisco Velazco
1990: Francisco Velazco
1991: Juan Hernández
1992: Juan Hernández
1993: Pedro Piñera
1994: José Pérez
1995: José Pérez
1996: Alexis Sánchez
1997: José Pérez
1998: Emilio Valle
1999: Jaciel Zamora
2000: Jorge Moreno
2001: 
2002: Sergio Hierrezuelo
2003: Sergio Hierrezuelo
2004: Sergio Hierrezuelo
2005: Sergio Hierrezuelo
2006: Yusbel Poll

High jump
1986: Javier Sotomayor
1987: Javier Sotomayor
1988: Javier Sotomayor
1989: Javier Sotomayor
1990: Lázaro Chacón
1991: Javier Sotomayor
1992: Javier Sotomayor
1993: Javier Sotomayor
1994: Javier Sotomayor
1995: Javier Sotomayor
1996: Andrés Leal
1997: Andrés Leal
1998: Javier Sotomayor
1999: Javier Sotomayor
2000: Lázaro Suárez
2001: Javier Sotomayor
2002: Yordán Lugones
2003: Dailen Ortega
2004: Yunier Carrillo
2005: Lisvany Pérez
2006: Víctor Moya

Pole vault
1986: Rubén Camino
1987: Rubén Camino
1988: Ángel García
1989: Rubén Camino
1990: Ángel García
1991: Ángel García
1992: Alberto Manzano
1993: Alberto Manzano
1994: Alberto Manzano
1995: Alberto Manzano
1996: Alberto Manzano
1997: Alberto Manzano
1998: 
1999: Ángel García
2000: Amaury Fernández
2001: Amaury Fernández
2002: Frank Céspedes
2003: Frank Céspedes
2004: Frank Céspedes
2005: Lázaro Borges
2006: Lázaro Borges

Long jump
1986: Jaime Jefferson
1987: Juan Ortiz
1988: Jaime Jefferson
1989: Jaime Jefferson
1990: Jaime Jefferson
1991: Jaime Jefferson
1992: Iván Pedroso
1993: Iván Pedroso
1994: Jaime Jefferson
1995: Iván Pedroso
1996: Jaime Jefferson
1997: Iván Pedroso
1998: Iván Pedroso
1999: Joan Lino Martínez
2000: Iván Pedroso
2001: Yoelmis Pacheco
2002: Ibrahim Camejo
2003: Yoelmis Pacheco
2004: Yoelmis Pacheco
2005: Iván Pedroso
2006: Ibrahim Camejo

Triple jump
1986: Lázaro Betancourt
1987: Jorge Reyna
1988: Juan Miguel López
1989: Juan Miguel López
1990: Lázaro Betancourt
1991: Yoelbi Quesada
1992: Yoelbi Quesada
1993: Yoelbi Quesada
1994: Yoelbi Quesada
1995: Yoelbi Quesada
1996: Aliecer Urrutia
1997: Yoelbi Quesada
1998: Yoelbi Quesada
1999: Yoel García
2000: Michael Calvo
2001: Michael Calvo
2002: Yoandri Betanzos
2003: Yoandri Betanzos
2004: Yoandri Betanzos
2005: Yoandri Betanzos
2006: Yoandri Betanzos

Shot put
1986: Paul Ruiz
1987: Paul Ruiz
1988: Paul Ruiz
1989: Paul Ruiz
1990: Paul Ruiz
1991: Jorge Montenegro
1992: Jorge Montenegro
1993: Jorge Montenegro
1994: Carlos Fandiño
1995: Carlos Fandiño
1996: Yosvany Obregón
1997: Carlos Fandiño
1998: Carlos Fandiño
1999: Alexis Paumier
2000: Alexis Paumier
2001: 
2002: Alexis Paumier
2003: Alexis Paumier
2004: Alexis Paumier
2005: Alexis Paumier
2006: Yoisel Toledo

Discus throw
1986: Raúl Calderón
1987: Luis Delís
1988: Juan Martínez Brito
1989: Roberto Moya
1990: Juan Martínez Brito
1991: Juan Martínez Brito
1992: Roberto Moya
1993: Roberto Moya
1994: Roberto Moya
1995: Roberto Moya
1996: Alexis Elizalde
1997: Alexis Elizalde
1998: Alexis Elizalde
1999: Alexis Elizalde
2000: Alexis Elizalde
2001: Alexis Elizalde
2002: Lois Maikel Martínez
2003: Frank Casañas
2004: Frank Casañas
2005: Frank Casañas
2006: Lois Maikel Martínez

Hammer throw
1986: Vicente Sánchez
1987: Francisco Soria
1988: Eladio Hernández
1989: Eladio Hernández
1990: René Díaz
1991: René Díaz
1992: Eladio Hernández
1993: Alberto Sánchez
1994: Alberto Sánchez
1995: Alberto Sánchez
1996: Alberto Sánchez
1997: Alberto Sánchez
1998: Alberto Sánchez
1999: Yosvany Suárez
2000: Yosmel Montes
2001: Yosmel Montes
2002: Yosvany Suárez
2003: Yosvany Suárez
2004: Yosmel Montes
2005: Erik Jiménez
2006: Noleysi Bicet

Javelin throw
1986: Ramón González
1987: Martín Álvarez
1988: Ramón González
1989: Ramón González
1990: Ramón González
1991: Ramón González
1992: Héctor Duharte
1993: Ovidio Trimino
1994: Emeterio González
1995: Emeterio González
1996: Emeterio González
1997: Emeterio González
1998: Emeterio González
1999: Emeterio González
2000: Emeterio González
2001: Emeterio González
2002: Emeterio González
2003: Isbel Luaces
2004: Guillermo Martínez
2005: Guillermo Martínez
2006: Guillermo Martínez

Decathlon
1986: Ernesto Betancourt
1987: Miguel Valle
1988: Luis Milanes
1989: ?
1990: Luis Milanes
1991: Eugenio Balanqué
1992: Ernesto Betancourt
1993: Eugenio Balanqué
1994: Eugenio Balanqué
1995: Raúl Duany
1996: Raúl Duany
1997: Jorge Moreno
1998: Yonelvis Águila
1999: Yonelvis Águila
2000: Raúl Duany
2001: Yonelvis Águila
2002: Yonelvis Águila
2003: Yonelvis Águila
2004: Alberto Juantorena Jr.
2005: Alexis Chivás
2006: Yordanis García

20 kilometres walk
The 1993 championship was held as a track event.
1986: Edel Oliva
1987: Juan Velázquez
1988: Daniel Vargas
1989: Edel Oliva
1990: Edel Oliva
1991: Daniel Vargas
1992: ?
1993: Daniel Vargas
1994: Ihosvany Díaz
1995: Daniel Vargas
1996: Daniel Vargas
1997: Francisco Gutiérrez
1998: Francisco Gutiérrez
1999: Jorge Luis Pino
2000: Francisco Gutiérrez
2001: Francisco Gutiérrez
2002: Jorge Luis Pino
2003: Jorge Luis Pino
2004: ?
2005: Loisel Gutiérrez
2006: Yubraile Hernández

50 kilometres walk
1986: Edel Oliva
1987: Edel Oliva
1988: Edel Oliva
1989: Edel Oliva
1990: Edel Oliva
1991: Daniel Vargas
1992: ?
1993: ?
1994: Edel Oliva
1995: Ricardo Risquet
1996: Jorge Luis Pino
1997: Jorge Luis Pino
1998: Jorge Luis Pino
1999: Ihosvany Díaz

Women

100 metres
1986: Idania Pino
1987: Miriam Ferrer
1988: Liliana Allen
1989: Liliana Allen
1990: Liliana Allen
1991: Liliana Allen
1992: Liliana Allen
1993: Liliana Allen
1994: Liliana Allen
1995: Liliana Allen
1996: Idalia Hechevarría
1997: Virgen Benavides
1998: Virgen Benavides
1999: Virgen Benavides
2000: Ana López
2001: Virgen Benavides
2002: Roxana Díaz
2003: Roxana Díaz
2004: Misleidis Lazo
2005: Virgen Benavides
2006: Roxana Díaz

200 metres
1986: Ester Petitón
1987: Susana Armenteros
1988: Liliana Allen
1989: Eusebia Riquelme
1990: Liliana Allen
1991: Liliana Allen
1992: Liliana Allen
1993: Liliana Allen
1994: Liliana Allen
1995: Liliana Allen
1996: Daimí Pernía
1997: Idalmis Bonne
1998: Virgen Benavides
1999: Virgen Benavides
2000: Roxana Díaz
2001: Ana López
2002: Roxana Díaz
2003: Roxana Díaz
2004: Roxana Díaz
2005: Roxana Díaz
2006: Roxana Díaz

400 metres
1986: Migdalia Peña
1987: Tania Fernández
1988: Ana Fidelia Quirot
1989: Ana Fidelia Quirot
1990: Zoilda Guilbert
1991: Ana Fidelia Quirot
1992: Nancy McLeón
1993: Nancy McLeón
1994: Julia Duporty
1995: Julia Duporty
1996: Ana Fidelia Quirot
1997: Julia Duporty
1998: Julia Duporty
1999: Zulia Calatayud
2000: Julia Duporty
2001: Yudalis Díaz
2002: Ana Peña
2003: Lisvania Grenot
2004: Lisvania Grenot
2005: Lisvania Grenot
2006: Aymée Martínez

800 metres
1986: Idalmis López
1987: Mercedes Álvarez
1988: Maura Savón
1989: Ana Fidelia Quirot
1990: Maura Savón
1991: Ana Fidelia Quirot
1992: Ana Fidelia Quirot
1993: Nancy McLeón
1994: Odalmis Limonta
1995: Ana Fidelia Quirot
1996: Ana Fidelia Quirot
1997: Ana Fidelia Quirot
1998: Ana Fidelia Quirot
1999: Zulia Calatayud
2000: Zulia Calatayud
2001: Zulia Calatayud
2002: Adriana Muñoz
2003: Adriana Muñoz
2004: Yanelis Lara
2005: Adriana Muñoz
2006: Yusneysi Santiusti

1500 metres
1986: Eloína Kerr
1987: Milagro Rodríguez
1988: Milagro Rodríguez
1989: Milagro Rodríguez
1990: Milagro Rodríguez
1991: Milagro Rodríguez
1992: Maura Savón
1993: María Contreras
1994: Liudmila Dubois
1995: Liudmila Dubois
1996: Yesenia Centeno
1997: Ana Fidelia Quirot
1998: Ana Fidelia Quirot
1999: Niuvis Pie
2000: Yoenny Mayacen
2001: Yanelis Lara
2002: Adriana Muñoz
2003: Adriana Muñoz
2004: Adriana Muñoz
2005: Adriana Muñoz
2006: Yusneysi Santiusti

3000 metres
1986: Sergia Martínez
1987: ?
1988: Milagro Rodríguez
1989: ?
1990: Milagro Rodríguez
1991: Milagro Rodríguez
1992: Milagro Rodríguez
1993: Milagro Rodríguez
1994: Yesenia Centeno

5000 metres
1986: Maribel Durruty
1987: Maribel Durruty
1988: Milagro Rodríguez
1989: Not held
1990: Not held
1991: Not held
1992: Not held
1993: Not held
1994: Natalia Aróstica
1995: Mariela González
1996: Milagro Rodríguez
1997: Yailén García
1998: Mariela González
1999: Mariela González
2000: Yudelkis Martínez
2001: Mariela González
2002: Yudelkis Martínez
2003: Yudelkis Martínez
2004: Yudelkis Martínez
2005: Yanisleidis Castillo
2006: Yusneysi Santiusti

10,000 metres
1986: Lucia Conde
1987: Maribel Durruty
1988: Maribel Durruty
1989: Adelaida Iglesias
1990: Maribel Durruty
1991: Natalia Aróstica
1992: Emperatriz Wilson
1993: Milagro Rodríguez
1994: Yesenia Centeno
1995: Emperatriz Wilson
1996: Mariela González
1997: Milagro Rodríguez
1998: Nurian Sáez
1999: Mariela González
2000: Mariela González
2001: Yudelkis Martínez
2002: Mariela González
2003: Yudelkis Martínez
2004: ?
2005: Mariela González
2006: Yaremis Torres

Marathon
1987: Emperatriz Wilson
1988: Emperatriz Wilson
1989: Maribel Durruty
1990: Emperatriz Wilson
1991: Emperatriz Wilson
1992: ?
1993: ?
1994: ?
1995: Fidelina Limonta
1996: ?
1997: Maribel Durruty
1998: Maribel Durruty
1999: Sergia Martínez
2000: ?
2001: ?
2002: ?
2003: Emperatriz Wilson
2004: Mariela González
2005: ?
2006: ?

2000 metres steeplechase
1997: Liudmila Dubois
1998: ?
1999: Lismeidys Rolando

100 metres hurdles
1986: Aliuska López
1987: Aliuska López
1988: Aliuska López
1989: Aliuska López
1990: Odalys Adams
1991: Odalys Adams
1992: Odalys Adams
1993: Aliuska López
1994: Aliuska López
1995: Aliuska López
1996: Aliuska López
1997: Aliuska López
1998: Dainelky Pérez
1999: Aliuska López
2000: Aliuska López
2001: 
2002: Anay Tejeda
2003: Anay Tejeda
2004: Anay Tejeda
2005: Anay Tejeda
2006: Yahumara Neira

400 metres hurdles
1986: Odalys Hernández
1987: Tania Fernández
1988: Tania Fernández
1989: Elsa Jiménez
1990: Elsa Jiménez
1991: Tania Fernández
1992: Lency Montelier
1993: Elsa Jiménez
1994: Lency Montelier
1995: Lency Montelier
1996: Odalys Hernández
1997: Daimí Pernía
1998: Lency Montelier
1999: Daimí Pernía
2000: Yasnay Lescay
2001: Daimí Pernía
2002: Yudalis Díaz
2003: Dayaní Lara
2004: Yaniuska Pérez
2005: Yaniuska Pérez
2006: Daimí Pernía

High jump
1986: Silvia Costa
1987: Silvia Costa
1988: Silvia Costa
1989: Dania Fernández
1990: Ioamnet Quintero
1991: Ioamnet Quintero
1992: Ioamnet Quintero
1993: Ioamnet Quintero
1994: Silvia Costa
1995: Ioamnet Quintero
1996: Ioamnet Quintero
1997: Niurka Lussón
1998: 
1999: 
2000: Ioamnet Quintero
2001: Ioamnet Quintero
2002: Yanisleidi Fernández
2003: Yarianny Argüelles
2004: Yarianny Argüelles
2005: Yarianny Argüelles
2006: Yarianny Argüelles

Pole vault
1997: Kenia Sánchez
1998: Mariana McCarthy
1999: Mariana McCarthy
2000: Katiuska Pérez
2001: Mariana McCarthy
2002: Katiuska Pérez
2003: Katiuska Pérez
2004: Yarisley Silva
2005: Katiuska Pérez
2006: Yarisley Silva

Long jump
1986: Adelina Polledo
1987: Eloína Echevarría
1988: Niurka Montalvo
1989: Eloína Echevarría
1990: Niurka Montalvo
1991: Virginia Martínez
1992: Eloína Echevarría
1993: Niurka Montalvo
1994: Niurka Montalvo
1995: Niurka Montalvo
1996: Lissette Cuza
1997: Olga Cepero
1998: Yamilé Paumier
1999: Lissette Cuza
2000: Lissette Cuza
2001: Lissette Cuza
2002: Lissette Cuza
2003: Yudelkis Fernández
2004: Yargelis Savigne
2005: Yudelkis Fernández
2006: Yargelis Savigne

Triple jump
1992: Eloína Echevarría
1993: Niurka Montalvo
1994: Niurka Montalvo
1995: Olga Cepero
1996: Olga Cepero
1997: Yamilé Aldama
1998: Yamilé Aldama
1999: Yamilé Aldama
2000: Yamilé Aldama
2001: Yusmay Bicet
2002: Olga Cepero
2003: Mabel Gay
2004: Mabel Gay
2005: Yusmay Bicet
2006: Mabel Gay

Shot put
1986: Marcelina Rodríguez
1987: Belsy Laza
1988: Belsy Laza
1989: Belsy Laza
1990: Belsy Laza
1991: Belsy Laza
1992: Belsy Laza
1993: Belsy Laza
1994: Yumileidi Cumbá
1995: Yumileidi Cumbá
1996: Belsy Laza
1997: Herminia Fernández
1998: Yumileidi Cumbá
1999: Belsy Laza
2000: Yumileidi Cumbá
2001: Yumileidi Cumbá
2002: Yumileidi Cumbá
2003: Yumileidi Cumbá
2004: Yumileidi Cumbá
2005: Yumileidi Cumbá
2006: Yumileidi Cumbá

Discus throw
1986: Maritza Martén
1987: Maritza Martén
1988: Hilda Ramos
1989: Maritza Martén
1990: Maritza Martén
1991: Bárbara Hechavarría
1992: Hilda Ramos
1993: Maritza Martén
1994: Bárbara Hechavarría
1995: Maritza Martén
1996: Bárbara Hechavarría
1997: Maritza Martén
1998: Bárbara Hechavarría
1999: Ana Elys Fernández
2000: Yania Ferrales
2001: Yania Ferrales
2002: Yuneidis Bonne
2003: Anaelys Fernández
2004: Yania Ferrales
2005: Yania Ferrales
2006: Yania Ferrales

Hammer throw
1995: Norbi Balantén
1996: Norbi Balantén
1997: Norbi Balantén
1998: Norbi Balantén
1999: Yipsi Moreno
2000: Yipsi Moreno
2001: Yipsi Moreno
2002: Yipsi Moreno
2003: Yipsi Moreno
2004: Yipsi Moreno
2005: Yunaika Crawford
2006: Yunaika Crawford

Javelin throw
1986: María Caridad Colón
1987: María Caridad Colón
1988: Ivonne Leal
1989: Dulce García
1990: Isel López
1991: Dulce García
1992: Isel López
1993: Dulce García
1994: Xiomara Rivero
1995: Sonia Bisset
1996: Isel López
1997: Osleidys Menéndez
1998: Sonia Bisset
1999: Osleidys Menéndez
2000: Osleidys Menéndez
2001: Osleidys Menéndez
2002: Osleidys Menéndez
2003: Osleidys Menéndez
2004: Osleidys Menéndez
2005: Osleidys Menéndez
2006: Osleidys Menéndez

Heptathlon
1986: Caridad Balcindes
1987: Victoria Despaigne
1988: Yolaida Pompa
1989: ?
1990: Magalys García
1991: Laiza Carrillo
1992: Yolaida Pompa
1993: ?
1994: Magalys García
1995: Magalys García
1996: Magalys García
1997: Miroslava Ibarra
1998: Regla Cárdenas
1999: Regla Cárdenas
2000: Magalys García
2001: Osiris Pedroso
2002: Magalys García
2003: Magalys García
2004: Yuleidis Limonta
2005: Yasmiany Pedroso
2006: Grechel Quintana

5000 metres walk
The 1988 and 1991 championships were held as road events.
1988: Margarita Morales
1989: Margarita Morales
1990: Yoslaine Puñales
1991: Yoslaine Puñales
1992: ?
1993: ?
1994: ?
1995: Oslaidis Cruz
1996: Oslaidis Cruz
1997: Oslaidis Cruz

10 kilometres walk
The 1987, 1989 and 1993 championships were held as track events.
1987: Margarita Morales
1988: Margarita Morales
1989: Margarita Morales
1990: Yoslaine Puñales
1991: Yoslaine Puñales
1992: ?
1993: Maribel Calderín
1994: Oslaidis Cruz
1995: Oslaidis Cruz
1996: Oslaidis Cruz
1997: Marisleidis Martínez
1998: Oslaidis Cruz
1999: Oslaidis Cruz

20 kilometres walk
1999: Oslaidis Cruz
2000: Yarelis Sánchez
2001: Oslaidis Cruz
2002: Yarelis Sánchez
2003: Yaimara Pérez
2004: Yarelis Sánchez
2005: Yarelis Sánchez
2006: Yarelis Sánchez

References

Champions 1986–2006
Cuban Championships. GBR Athletics. Retrieved 2021-01-29.

Winners
 List
Cuban Championships
Athletics